Alta Vista High School may refer to:

Alta Vista High School (Arizona), Tucson, Arizona
Alta Vista High School (California), Vista, California
Altavista High School, Altavista, Virginia

See also
 Alta Vista (disambiguation)